Super Cassettes Industries Private Limited, doing business as T-Series, is an Indian music record label and film production company founded by Gulshan Kumar on 11 July 1983. It is primarily known for Bollywood music soundtracks and Indi-pop music. As of 2014, T-Series is India's largest music record label, with up to a 35% share of the Indian music market, followed by Sony Music India and Zee Music. T-Series also owns and operates the most-viewed and the most-subscribed YouTube channel, with over 233 million subscribers and 212billion total views  While best known as a music label, T-Series has also had some moderate success as a film production company.

Kumar, initially a fruit juice seller in Delhi, founded T-Series to sell pirated Bollywood songs before the company eventually began producing new music. Their breakthrough came with the soundtrack for the 1988 Bollywood blockbuster Qayamat Se Qayamat Tak, composed by Anand–Milind, written by Majrooh Sultanpuri, and starring Aamir Khan and Juhi Chawla, which became one of the best-selling Indian music albums of the 1980s, with over 8million sales. They eventually became a leading music label with the release of Aashiqui (1990), composed by Nadeem–Shravan, which sold 20million copies and became the best-selling Indian soundtrack album of all time. However, Gulshan Kumar was murdered by the Mumbai mafia syndicate D-Company on 12 August 1997. Since then, T-Series has been led by his son Bhushan Kumar and younger brother Krishan Kumar.

On YouTube, T-Series has a multi-channel network, with 30 channels (including Lahari Music) that have over 382.3 million subscribers as of 15 December 2021. The company's YouTube team consists of 13people at the T-Series headquarters. The company's main T-Series channel on YouTube primarily shows music videos as well as film trailers. It became the most-viewed YouTube channel in January 2017. The T-Series channel primarily features content in the Hindi language, and occasionally several other languages including Bhojpuri, Punjabi and English. T-Series also have other channels dedicated to content in several Indian languages including Bhojpuri, Punjabi, Tamil, Telugu, Malayalam, Kannada, Gujarati, Marathi and Rajasthani.

History
T-Series was founded on 11 July 1983 by Gulshan Kumar, at the time a fruit juice seller in the Daryaganj neighbourhood of Delhi. The company initially sold pirated Bollywood songs, prior to releasing original music. Back then, the Indian audio cassette market was small-scale, with widespread piracy, but there was growing demand for cassette music. According to Rediff, while Kumar "was involved in piracy, he was passionately market- and consumer-driven." The company also took advantage of loopholes in copyright law allowing for the release of cover versions of songs, which T-Series would then flood the market with. Researchers Lawrence Liang and Ravi Sundaram wrote:

Kumar discovered that there was also a market for devotional music, and began recording and selling it. Kumar noticed that many elderly Hindu followers could not read hymns and chants because of failing eyesight, so Kumar hired singers to record the chants and sold them as cheap cassettes. Later, he filmed major Hindu pilgrimages in India and sold them on VHS and video cassette tapes.

T-Series' first original film soundtrack release was for Lallu Ram in 1984, with music scored by Ravindra Jain.
The company's breakthrough came when it released the soundtrack for the 1988 Bollywood blockbuster Qayamat Se Qayamat Tak (also known as QSQT), directed by Mansoor Khan and starring Aamir Khan and Juhi Chawla. The Qayamat Se Qayamat Tak soundtrack, composed by Anand–Milind and written by Majrooh Sultanpuri, became the best-selling Indian soundtrack album of 1988 and one of the best-selling Indian soundtrack albums of the 1980s, with more than 8 million units sold. The biggest hit song from the album was "Papa Kehte Hain", sung by Udit Narayan and picturised on Aamir Khan. T-Series founder Gulshan Kumar soon played a key role in Bollywood's cassette boom of the late 1980s with his affordable T-Series albums.

T-Series later became a leading music label with the release of Aashiqui (1990), directed by Mahesh Bhatt. The Aashiqui film soundtrack album, composed by the duo Nadeem–Shravan, sold 20 million units in India, and is the best-selling Bollywood soundtrack album of all time. A cover version of "Dheere Dheere" from Aashiqui was later sung by Yo Yo Honey Singh and released by T-Series in 2015.

T-Series was largely responsible for sparking a boom for the Indian music industry in the early 1990s. Many of the best-selling Bollywood music albums of the 1990s, particularly those composed by Nadeem–Shravan, were released under the T-Series label. Besides music production, the company also began venturing into film production.

In 1997, T-Series founder Gulshan Kumar was murdered by the Mumbai mafia syndicate D-Company. His assassination also led to T-Series losing its most prolific musicians at the time, Nadeem–Shravan, due to Nadeem Akhtar Saifi initially being accused of involvement in the murder, before later being exonerated. After Gulshan Kumar's death in 1997, the company has since been led by his son Bhushan Kumar, with the help of Gulshan's younger brother Krishan Kumar.

As a film production company, T-Series has had some moderate success. The highest-grossing T-Series film production to date is the critically acclaimed sleeper hit Hindi Medium (2017), written by Zeenat Lakhani, directed by Saket Chaudhary, and starring Irrfan Khan and Saba Qamar. T-Series is also producing a biopic film based on the life of its founder Gulshan Kumar, called Mogul, which is currently under production and is scheduled for release in 2019.

YouTube presence

T-Series joined YouTube on 13 March 2006, but only started uploading videos in late 2010. Under this channel, T-Series primarily shows music videos and film trailers. By July 2013, it had crossed 1 billion views, becoming the second Indian YouTube channel to cross the milestone after Rajshri Productions. In January 2017, T-Series surpassed PewDiePie to become the world's most-viewed YouTube channel, and as of July 2022 it has over 197 billion views. The T-Series YouTube channel is run by a team of 13people at the T-Series headquarters.

As of July 2022, T-Series has 221 million subscribers, making it the most-subscribed YouTube channel, exceeding the second-placed Cocomelon by 82 million. When it reached 50 million subscribers, the channel received a Custom Ruby Play Button on 10 September 2018. It is also the second channel ever to hit 70 million subscribers. On 29 May 2019, T-Series became the first channel to reach 100 million subscribers. In December 2021, T-Series became the first channel to reach 200 million subscribers. On average, T-Series has 66,000 daily subscribers.

T-Series channel also owns a multi-channel network, with 29 channels (excluding Lahari Music), which include YouTube channels such as T-Series Tamil, T-Series Telugu, Bollywood Classics, T-Series Kids Hut, T-Series Apna Punjab, T-Series Kannada, Shabad Gurbani, Health And Fitness, T-Series Bhakti Sagar (mainly dedicated to Hindu devotional music, and to a lesser extent Jain, Sikh, Muslim, Buddhist and Christian), Pop Chartbusters, T-Series Malayalam, T-Series Classics, T-Series Regional, hamaarbhojpuri, T-Series Gujarati, T-Series Marathi, T-Series Bhavageethegalu & Folk, Bhakti Sagar Telugu, Bhakti Sagar Tamil, Bhakti Sagar Malayalam, T-Series Bhakti Marathi, Bhakti Sagar Kannada, T-Series Islamic Music, T-Series Kids Hut-Portuguese Fairy Tales, T-Series Haryanvi, T-Series Kids Hut-Telugu Kathalu, T-Series Kids Hut-Cuentos en Español and T-Series Kids Hut Tamil. On top of this, seven of their channels are among the top 100 most-subscribed channels in India, including T-Series, Bhakti Sagar, Apna Punjab, Pop Chartbusters, Bollywood Classics, T-Series Regional, Lahari Music. T-Series' 29 channels accumulated a total of more than 184 million YouTube subscribers as of July 2019. Online revenue contributes to at least 60% of the company's overall revenue.

The most popular song on the T-Series channel is "Dilbar" (2018), an updated version of a 1999 song from Sirf Tum originally composed by Nadeem–Shravan, reinvisioned by Tanishk Bagchi with Middle-Eastern musical influences, and a music video featuring Arabic belly dancing from Moroccan-Canadian dancer Nora Fatehi. It has become one of the most popular Bollywood music videos of all time, with its international success inspiring an Arabic language version released by T-Series, also featuring Nora Fatehi. "Dilbar" is popular across South Asia and the Arab world, with all versions of the song having received more than 1billion views on YouTube. The most popular T-Series artist on YouTube is Punjabi language artist Guru Randhawa, whose song "Lahore" (2017) crossed 700 million views on YouTube. "Slowly Slowly", Guru Randhawa's collaboration with American rapper Pitbull released by T-Series, received 38million views within a day, becoming one of the most-viewed music videos in 24 hours.

The growth of T-Series' YouTube channel has been attributed to India's emerging online population. India currently has 500 million Internet users and this number is expected to grow rapidly. A major breakthrough in India's Internet growth came in September 2016 with the advent of 4G network Reliance Jio, offering data at very low costs. India has since emerged as the world's second-largest online population (behind China, where YouTube is blocked), with YouTube alone having over 225 million monthly Indian users. India's high demand for YouTube content and the lack of local content creators has contributed significantly to the rapid growth of T-Series.

The growth of T-Series is also attributed to its growing audience outside of India. About 40% of the channel's traffic comes from outside of India, including 12% from the United States. The majority of the channel's overseas viewers belong to the global South Asian diaspora. More recently, the channel's overseas viewership has increased further, as a result of attention and controversy drawn to the channel by foreign YouTubers such as PewDiePie and MrBeast. On 22 February 2019 at 6:04 AM, T-Series surpassed PewDiePie for the first time to become the most-subscribed YouTube channel, with PewDiePie regaining the spot 8 minutes later. T-Series overtook PewDiePie in a similar manner many more times over the following weeks, and on 27 March, finally gained and maintained, until 1 April, the top spot by a fluctuating, but overall growing, margin.

Legal issues
In November 2007, T-Series filed a lawsuit against YouTube for infringing on the copyright of its music by allowing users to upload videos of its music onto YouTube, which could be accessed for free, and obtained an interim order against YouTube from the Delhi High Court, which restrained YouTube from infringing on its copyrights. T-Series and YouTube settled out of court in January 2011.

In April 2019, after PewDiePie released two diss tracks against T-Series, "Congratulations" and "Bitch Lasagna", T-Series filed a complaint with the Delhi High Court to have the songs removed from YouTube, arguing that they were "defamatory, disparaging, insulting, and offensive". Despite Kjellberg's statement that these diss tracks were "done in good fun", the court issued a temporary injunction in favour of T-Series on 8 April 2019 and access to the diss tracks on YouTube was blocked in India. In August 2019, it was reported that T-Series and PewDiePie had settled their legal disputes outside of court.

List of artists

The following notable musical artists have worked with T-Series and/or had music released under the T-Series label:

A. R. Rahman
Aadesh Shrivastava
Arijit Singh
Abhijeet Bhattacharya
Akon
Adnan Sami
Alisha Chinai
Alka Yagnik
Anand–Milind (Anand Shrivastav and Milind Shrivastav)
Anu Malik
Anuradha Paudwal
Anwar
Armaan Malik
Amaal Mallik
Asees Kaur
Asha Bhosle
Atif Aslam
Babul Supriyo
Dhvani Bhanushali
Darshan Raval
Gulzar
Gurdas Maan
Guru Randhawa
Harrdy Sandhu
Himesh Reshammiya
Ikka
Irshad Kamil
Jagjit Singh
Jasmin Walia
Jatin-Lalit (Jatin Pandit and Lalit Pandit)
Javed Akhtar
Jubin Nautiyal
K.K
K. S. Chithra
Kalyanji–Anandji (Kalyanji Virji Shah and Anandji Virji Shah)
Kavita Krishnamurthy
Kishore Kumar
Kumar Sanu
Lata Mangeshkar
Laxmikant–Pyarelal (Laxmikant Shantaram Patil Kudalkar and Pyarelal Ramprasad Sharma)
Lucky Ali
M.I.A.
Manhar Udhas
Mohammed Aziz
Nadeem–Shravan (Nadeem Akhtar Saifi and Shravan Kumar)
Neha Kakkar
Nikhil-Vinay (Nikhil Kamath and Vinay Tiwari)
Nitin Mukesh
Nora Fatehi
Pawan Singh
Pritam
Pankaj Udhas
Pitbull
Purnima
Raamlaxman
Rahat Fateh Ali Khan
Rajesh Roshan
Raju Singh
S. P. Balasubrahmanyam
Saawan Kumar Tak
Sadhana Sargam
Sajid–Wajid (Sajid Khan and Wajid Khan)
Sameer
Sandeep Chowta
Sapna Mukherjee
Shaan
Shabbir Ahmed
Shankar-Ehsaan-Loy (Shankar Mahadevan, Ehsaan Noorani, and Loy Mendonsa)
Shreya Ghoshal
Sonu Nigam
Sophie Choudry
Sukhwinder Singh
Sunidhi Chauhan
Suresh Wadkar
Talat Aziz
Tanishk Bagchi
Tanvi Shah
Udit Narayan
Vishal–Shekhar (Vishal Dadlani and Shekhar Ravjiani)
Vipin Sachdeva
Yo Yo Honey Singh
Zack Knight

Production filmography

1980s

1990s

2000s

2010s

2020s

Soundtrack discography

This is a list of soundtrack albums that were published under the T-Series label, excluding films that were also produced by T-Series (see Production filmography above). All information on the years of release of the albums has been/is being found with the help of Discogs and MySwar

Hindi cinema

Original

Amitabh Bachchan Corporation Limited (acquired)

Plus Music (acquired)

Krishna Music (acquired)

Big Music (acquired)

Kannada cinema
T-Series collaborated with Lahari Music.

Malayalam cinema
T-Series collaborated with Lahari Music.

Tamil cinema 
T-Series collaborated with Lahari Music, Big Music and other prominent labels.

Telugu cinema 
T-Series collaborated with Lahari Music or Aditya Music

International

See also
 PewDiePie vs T-Series

Notes

References

External links 

Super Cassettes Industries Limited (T-Series) at Internet Movie Database

T-Series
Record label distributors
Record labels established in 1971
Indian companies established in 1983
Film production companies of Delhi
Film production companies of India
Film distributors of India
Indian music record labels
Companies based in New Delhi
YouTube channels launched in 2006
Music-related YouTube channels
Number-one YouTube channels in subscribers